Sieteiglesias de Tormes is a village and municipality in the province of Salamanca,  western Spain, part of the autonomous community of Castile and León. It is located 31 kilometres from the provincial capital city of Salamanca and has a population of 204 people.

Geography
The municipality covers an area of 14 km².  It lies 821 metres above sea level and the postal code is 37892.

References

Municipalities in the Province of Salamanca